Kargar Boneh Gez Bueshehr Football Club is an Iranian football club based in Bushehr, Iran founded in 1980 that competes in the 2nd Division.

Season-by-Season
The table below shows the achievements of the club in various competitions.

References

Football clubs in Iran